Dušan Kerkez (Serbian Cyrillic: Душан Керкез; born 1 May 1976) is a Bosnian former professional footballer who played as a midfielder. He is the current professional football manager 
for Serbian SuperLiga club Čukarički.

Club career
In the 2001–02 season, Kerkez played regularly for Radnički Obrenovac and helped the club earn promotion to the First League of FR Yugoslavia for the first time in history. He then moved to Bosnia and Herzegovina and joined Leotar in the summer of 2002, helping them win the national championship in their debut appearance in the top flight.

After two years at Leotar, Kerkez switched to fellow Bosnian side Zrinjski Mostar in the summer of 2004, celebrating his second league title in his only season at the club. He subsequently moved to Croatia and signed with Rijeka, winning the national cup in his first year.

In the summer of 2007, Kerkez was transferred to Cypriot side AEL Limassol. He spent four seasons with the club, before switching to cross-town rivals Aris Limassol in the summer of 2011.

International career
Kerkez received his first call-up to the Bosnia and Herzegovina squad by manager Blaž Slišković and made his debut for them in a February 2004 friendly match away against Macedonia. He has earned a total of 4 caps, scoring no goals. He also played in an unofficial game against Iran in 2005. His final international was a September 2006 European Championship qualification against Hungary.

Personal life
Kerkez's son Strahinja Kerkez is also a professional footballer, and is a youth international for Cyprus.

Managerial statistics 
As of 19 March 2023

Honours

Player
Leotar
 Premier League of Bosnia and Herzegovina: 2002–03
Zrinjski Mostar
 Premier League of Bosnia and Herzegovina: 2004–05
Rijeka
 Croatian Cup: 2005–06

Manager
AEL Limassol
 Cypriot Cup: 2018–19

References

External links
 
 
 
 

1976 births
Living people
Footballers from Belgrade
Association football midfielders
Bosnia and Herzegovina footballers
Bosnia and Herzegovina international footballers
FK Voždovac players
FK Radnički Obrenovac players
FK Leotar players
HŠK Zrinjski Mostar players
HNK Rijeka players
AEL Limassol players
Aris Limassol FC players
Second League of Serbia and Montenegro players
Premier League of Bosnia and Herzegovina players
Croatian Football League players
Cypriot First Division players
Cypriot Second Division players
Bosnia and Herzegovina expatriate footballers
Expatriate footballers in Serbia and Montenegro
Bosnia and Herzegovina expatriate sportspeople in Serbia and Montenegro
Expatriate footballers in Croatia
Bosnia and Herzegovina expatriate sportspeople in Croatia
Expatriate footballers in Cyprus
Bosnia and Herzegovina expatriate sportspeople in Cyprus
Bosnia and Herzegovina football managers
AEL Limassol managers
Bosnia and Herzegovina expatriate football managers
Expatriate football managers in Cyprus